Evans House may refer to:

in the United States
(by state then city)
Evans-Kirby House, Harrison, Arkansas, listed on the National Register of Historic Places (NRHP) in Boone County
Evans House (Phoenix, Arizona), listed on the NRHP in Phoenix
Byers-Evans House, Denver, Colorado, NRHP-listed, also known as Evans House and listed in that name as a Denver Landmark
Anne Evans Mountain Home, Evergreen, Colorado, Listed on the NRHP in Clear Creek County
Ebenezer Evans House, Southington, Connecticut, listed on the NRHP in Hartford County
George Evans House, Newark, Delaware, listed on the NRHP in New Castle County
John Evans House (Newark, Delaware), Newark, Delaware, listed on the NRHP in New Castle County
J. B. Evans House, Delray Beach, Florida, listed on the NRHP in Palm Beach County
Wheeler-Evans House, Oviedo, Florida, listed on the NRHP in Seminole County
D. L. Evans, Sr., Bungalow, Malad City, Idaho, listed on the NRHP in Oneida County
Cole-Evans House, Noblesville, Indiana, listed on the NRHP in Hamilton County
Edward B. and Nettie E. Evans House, Des Moines, Iowa, listed on the NRHP in Polk County
Henry and Elizabeth Adkinson Evans House, Winterset, Iowa, listed on the NRHP in Madison County
 Evans House (Shopville, Kentucky), Listed on the NRHP in Pulaski County
Thomas P. Evans House, Tompkinsville, Kentucky, Listed on the NRHP in Monroe County
Hudson-Evans House, Detroit, Michigan, listed on the NRHP
Musgrove Evans House, Tecumseh, Michigan, listed on the NRHP
Christmas Gift Evans House, Helena, Montana, listed on the NRHP
Smith-Buntura-Evans House, Natchez, Mississippi, listed on the NRHP in Adams County
Dr. Carroll D. and Lorena R. North Evans House, Columbus, Nebraska, listed on the NRHP in Platte County
Amos Evans House, Marlton, New Jersey, listed on the NRHP in Burlington County
Stokes-Evans House, Marlton, New Jersey, listed on the NRHP in Burlington County
William and Susan Evans House, Marlton, New Jersey, listed on the NRHP in Burlington County
Evans-Cooper House, Pine Grove, New Jersey, Listed on the NRHP in New Jersey
Evans-Gaige-Dillenback House, Chaumont, New York, listed on the NRHP
Cornelius H. Evans House, Hudson, New York, Listed on the NRHP
E. Hervey Evans House, Laurinburg, North Carolina, listed on the NRHP in North Carolina
Mohrman-Jack-Evans House, Lebanon, Ohio, listed on the NRHP in Ohio
Vaugh-Stacy-Evans Farm Historic District, Lowell, Ohio, listed on the NRHP in Ohio
Evans-Holton-Owens House, Newark, Ohio, listed on the NRHP in Ohio
Wilson Bruce Evans House, Oberlin, Ohio, listed on the NRHP
 Evans House (Vinton, Ohio), listed on the NRHP in Vinton County
Richard W. Evans House, Worthington, Ohio, Listed on the NRHP in Ohio
Ann Cunningham Evans House, Caernarvon, Pennsylvania, Listed on the NRHP in Pennsylvania
William and Mordecai Evans House, Limerick Township, Pennsylvania, Listed on the NRHP in Pennsylvania
Benjamin Evans House, Nescopeck, Pennsylvania, Listed on the NRHP in Pennsylvania
Evans-Russell House, Spartanburg, South Carolina, listed on the NRHP
Brown-Evans House, Mobridge, South Dakota, listed on the NRHP in Walworth County
John and Coralin Evans Ranch, Piedmont, South Dakota, listed on the NRHP in Meade County
Robert H. Evans House, Spearfish, South Dakota, Listed on the NRHP in Lawrence County
Green-Evans House, Lynchburg, Tennessee, listed on the NRHP in Moore County
Winston Evans House, Shelbyville, Tennessee, listed on the NRHP in Bedford County
J. W. Evans House, Abilene, Texas, Listed on the NRHP in Taylor County
Britton-Evans House, Corpus Christi, Texas, listed on the NRHP in Nueces County
Annie Laurie Evans Hall, Prairie View, Texas, listed on the NRHP in Waller County
Evans House No. 2, Prices Fork, Virginia, listed on the NRHP
 Evans House (Salem, Virginia), listed on the NRHP
Evans-Tibbs House, Washington, D.C., listed on the NRHP
John Evans House (Martinsburg, West Virginia), Martinsburg, West Virginia, listed on the NRHP
Jonathan H. Evans House, Platteville, Wisconsin, listed on the NRHP in Grant County